John Jolliffe may refer to:
John Jolliffe (merchant) (1613–1680), Member of Parliament for Heytesbury, Governor of the Levant and Muscovy Companies
John Jolliffe (of Petersfield) (c. 1697–1771), lawyer and Member of Parliament for Petersfield
John Jolliffe (surgeon), ship's surgeon on HMS Pandora, for whom Mount Jolliffe, near Drury Inlet in British Columbia was named
John Jolliffe (librarian) (1929–1985), Bodley's Librarian from 1982 to 1985
Hon. John Hedworth Jolliffe (b. 1935), British writer, son of William Jolliffe, 4th Baron Hylton

See also 
 Jolliffe